Snarf, SNARF, or their variants may refer to:

Arts, entertainment, and media
Snarf, an underground comic published in the early 1970s by Denis Kitchen
Snarf (ThunderCats), one of several characters on the television show ThunderCats
Snarf (Trollz), a character from the animated television series Trollz
Snarf, the main character from SnarfQuest, a comic that ran from 1985–1989 in Dragon magazine''

Other uses
 Snarfing, a term using in computing to copy files over a network for any purpose, and in some contexts may mean illegal copying
SNARF-1, or Seminaphtharhodafluor, a fluorescent dye that changes colour with pH

See also
 Smarf
 Smurf